David Glenn Hays (November 17, 1928 – July 26, 1995) was a linguist, computer scientist and social scientist best known for his early work in machine translation and computational linguistics.

Career overview 

David Hays graduated from Harvard College in 1951 and received his Ph.D. in 1956 from Harvard's Department of Social Relations. In 1954-1955 he held a fellowship at the Center for Advanced Studies in the Behavioral Sciences at Stanford and took a job at the RAND Corporation, Santa Monica in 1955, where he remained though 1968. In 1969 he joined the faculty of the State University of New York at Buffalo where he was founding chairman of the newly formed linguistics department and Professor of Linguistics, of Computer Science, and of Information and Library Studies. He remained at Buffalo until 1980 when he retired from the university and moved to New York City, where he worked as a private consultant and pursued independent research in cultural evolution and the arts, especially the ballet. He was on the Editorial Board of the Journal of Social and Evolutionary Systems and starting in 1989 was a member of Connected Education's online faculty for their MA in Media Studies offered through The New School.

Language and computation 

During his years at RAND he worked on the machine translation of Russian technical literature into English and more generally on computational linguistics, a term that he created. The syntactic component of the RAND system was based on Lucien Tesnière's dependency grammar and Hays became its principal advocate in America. More than anyone else Hays is responsible for the realization that language processing should consist in the application of theoretically motivated grammars to specific texts by general algorithms. In 1967 Hays published the first textbook in computational linguistics, Introduction to Computational Linguistics. At his direction RAND assembled an annotated corpus of a million words of Russian text, and thus pioneered in what is now known as corpus linguistics.

Culture and cognition 

After leaving RAND and assuming his position at Buffalo, Hays turned to more a more general interest in language and cognition and, ultimately, the evolution of human culture. He developed an approach to abstract concepts in which their meaning was grounded in stories. Hays elaborated this idea in a series of articles and  employed the idea in their work. In 1982 he published Cognitive Structures, in which he developed a novel scheme for grounding cognition in perception and action as conceived in the control theory of William T. Powers. Working with William Benzon, he published a neural interpretation of this theory in 1988. During the 1980s and early 1990s he and Benzon developed a theory of cultural rank which they published in a series of papers (together and individually) and a book on the history of technology (Hays alone) in the early 1990s. His last major work was a critical review and synthesis of the empirical work that anthropologists and archaeologists had done on cultural complexity. This book was published posthumously as The Measurement of Cultural Evolution in the Non-Literate World: Homage to Raoul Naroll. At the time of his death, he had embarked on a study of the ballet, looking to understand how motion generates emotion.

Professional service 

Hays played an important role in the professional organization of computational linguistics. He advocated the organization of the Association for Computational Linguistics and served as its second president in 1964. He was the first editor of its journal, Computational Linguistics (then called the American Journal of Computational Linguistics) from 1974 to 1978; the journal was originally published on microfiche to facilitate rapid publication and allow for longer articles than is practical in hard-copy publication. He was one of the founders of the International Committee on Computational Linguistics, served as its chairman from 1965 to 1969 and was an honorary member from 1965 to 1995.

Publications 
Books, a selection 
 Introduction to Computational Linguistics, American Elsevier, New York, 1967  B00005W7K5
 Cognitive Structures, HRAF Press, New Haven, 1982  9991740309
 The Evolution of Technology, Preliminary Edition.  Diskette-book, Connected Editions, New York, 1991, available online.
 The Measurement of Cultural Evolution in the Non-Literate World: Homage to Raoul Naroll. Metagram Press, New York, 1994   0966725506

Articles, a selection
 (With Robert R. Bush) A study of group action.  American Sociological Review, 19:693-701, 1954.  Reprinted in Readings in Mathematical Psychology, edited by R. Duncan Luce, Robert R. Bush, and Eugene Galanter.  Wiley, 1965, 2:242-253
 Order of subject and object in scientific Russian when other differentia are lacking.  Mechanical Translation, 5:111-113, 1958
 Dependency theory: A formalism and some observations.  Language, 40: 511–525, 1964.  Reprinted in Syntactic Theory 1, Structuralist, edited by Fred W. Householder.  Penguin, 1972
 A billion books for education in America and the world: A proposal ([Rand Corporation] Memorandum RM-5574-RC) (Unknown Binding) 1968
 (With Enid Margolis, Raoul Naroll, and Revere Dale Perkins) Color term salience.  American Anthropologist, 74:1107-1121, 1972
 Cognitive networks and abstract terminology.  Journal of Clinical Computing, 3(2):110-118, 1973
 On 'alienation':  An essay in the psycholinguistics of science. In Theories of Alienation, edited by R. Felix Geyer and David R. Schweitzer.  Martinus Nijhoff, 1976, 169-187
 Machine translation and abstract terminology.  In Studies in Descriptive and Historical Linguistics, edited by Paul J. Hopper. John Benjamins, 1977, 95-108	
 (With David Bloom) Designation in English.  In Anaphora in Discourse, edited by John V. Hinds. Champaign, Ill., Linguistic Research 1978: 1-68
 (With William L. Benzon)  Principles and Development of Natural Intelligence.  Journal of Social and Biological Structures 11:1-30, 1988
 (With William L. Benzon)  The Evolution of Cognition.  Journal of Social and Biological Structures 13:297-320, 1990
 The Evolution of Expressive Culture. Journal of Social and Evolutionary Systems 15: 187–215, 1992
 Relativism and Progress. Journal of Social and Evolutionary Systems 18:9-32, 1995

References 

Hutchins, John, Machine Translation: past, present, future, (Ellis Horwood Series in Computers and their Applications) Chichester (UK): Ellis Horwood, 1986. New York: Halsted Press, 1986.

Kay, Martin, David G. Hays, in John Hutchins, ed. Early Years in Machine Translation: Memoirs and Biographies of Pioneers, Amsterdam/Philadelphia: John Benjamins Publishing Company, 2000,  pp. 165–170.

Saxon, Wolfgang, David G. Hays, 66, a Developer of Language Study by Computer, New York Times, July 28, 1995, Obituary, Section A, p. 20.

External links
 Yorick Wilks interviews Martin Kay Starting at about 4:25 Kay discusses Hays's contributions to computational linguistics.

Corpus linguists
Linguists
1928 births
1995 deaths
Harvard University alumni